The 2001–02 Mongolia Hockey League season was the eleventh season of the Mongolia Hockey League. EU Ulaanbaatar won the championship by defeating Shariin Gol in the playoff final.

Regular season

First round

Second round

Playoffs

Semifinals
Shariin Gol - Baganuur 4–7, 7–3, 7-4
EU Ulaanbaatar - Darkhan 2–3, 8–3, 9-1

Final
EU Ulaanbaatar - Shariin Gol 7-0

External links
Season on hockeyarchives.info

Mongolia
Mongolia Hockey League seasons